Occupation is a 2018 Australian science fiction action film, directed and written by Luke Sparke, with additional dialogue by Felix Williamson. The film was produced by Carly and Carmel Imrie, of SparkeFilms.

In February 2018, Saban Entertainment acquired rights to the film in the North American region. Pinnacle Film is responsible for the film's release in Australia and New Zealand. A sequel, Occupation: Rainfall, was released in 2020.

Plot 

A group of Australians form a resistance army after their small Australian country town is enslaved by an extraterrestrial force. Together they form the human rebellion in a battle for the survival of their group. They progressively find more members to join and form a small community in the Australian bush. Finally, they team up with the remnants of the Australian Army for the final conflict that will have a drastic impact on not only them but the whole world.

Cast 
 Dan Ewing as Matt Simmons
 Temuera Morrison as Peter Bartlett
 Rhiannon Fish as Vanessa
 Stephanie Jacobsen as Amelia Chambers
 Trystan Go as Marcus Chambers
 Zachary Garred as Dennis
 Felix Williamson as Seth
 Izzy Stevens as Bella Bartlett
 Charles Mesure as Arnold
 Charles Terrier as Jackson
 Jacqueline McKenzie as Colonel Grant
 Aaron Jeffery as Major Davis
 Erin Connor as Jenny Bartlett
 Bruce Spence as Alien Leader
 Rhylan Bush as Samuel Bartlett
 Roy Billing as Town Mayor

Production

Development 
Occupation was independently financed by SparkeFilms. The film was written, cast and financed in six months. The film was cast by the producers, who negotiated the roles with each individual agent in order to keep the film as universal as possible.

Filming and locations 
The six-week shoot took place between May 2017 to July 2017, with locations on Queensland's Gold Coast and in northern New South Wales. The film employed over 150 locals as extras for the scenes involving the Australian rules match between the Kookaburras and the Drop Bears at Murwillumbah Showgrounds.

Release 
Occupation had its world premiere at the Ritz Cinema in Randwick, New South Wales on 10 July 2018. It was then released Australia-wide on 12 July. The film was released in the United States on 20 July 2018.

Reception

Box office 
The film made a worldwide box office of $35,111, and an estimated total sale of $820,000.

Critical response 

Justin Lowe of The Hollywood Reporter wrote: "Occupation gets the job done with a minimum of fuss and an abundance of explosive set pieces that will likely endear it to domestic fans, even if it's mostly forgettable otherwise."
Noel Murray of the Los Angeles Times wrote: "This is the rare action movie that's almost more exciting when the characters put down their guns and take up an argument."

Sequel 
A sequel entitled Occupation: Rainfall was released on January 28, 2021, with Dan Ewing and Temuera Morrison returning and Daniel Gillies and Ken Jeong joining the cast. In September 2020, it was announced that Jason Isaacs had joined the cast of the sequel, which was in post-production at the time of the news.

References

External links
 

2018 films
Alien invasions in films
Australian science fiction action films
2018 science fiction action films
2010s English-language films